Parliamentary elections were held in Lithuania on 14–15 July 1940 to the so-called People's Seimas. They followed an ultimatum from the Soviet Union to allow Soviet troops to enter the country and operate freely. The elections were rigged and only communist candidates were allowed to run.

Background
President Antanas Smetona left Lithuania on 15 June as the Red Army occupied the country and took control of the government.

On 1 July the puppet People's Government led by Justas Paleckis announced elections to a new parliament, the People's Seimas, to be held on 14 July. The Communist Party of Lithuania emerged from underground with 1,500 members. Soon afterwards, the government announced the formation of the Union of the Working People of Lithuania, ostensibly a popular front. Voters were presented with a single list of candidates, including some non-communists. Just one candidate was presented for every seat in the new parliament and no other organizations were allowed to participate. On 11 and 12 July, the Soviet authorities stifled the opposition by arresting leading figures of the previous government and deporting some of them to the interior of the Soviet Union – even though Lithuania was still formally an independent state. The elections were later extended into 15 July. Each voter had his or her passport stamped after voting. According to the official results, voter turnout reached 95% and the Union list received over 99% of the votes. Most of the original election records were destroyed. The remaining data shows that turnout was indeed high, but that many ballots were invalid (missing, destroyed, left blank, or marked with anti-Soviet slogans). The results were announced even before the polls closed.

The new parliament was convened on 21 July and voted unanimously to established the Lithuanian SSR and request to join the Soviet Union. The country became the Soviet Union's fourteenth member on 3 August.

See also
1940 Estonian parliamentary election
1940 Latvian parliamentary election

References

Lithuania
Single-candidate elections
1940 in Lithuania
July 1940 events
Parliamentary elections in Lithuania